The Maharaja Lela-class frigate, also known as the littoral combat ship (LCS), is a class of six stealth frigates being built for the Royal Malaysian Navy (RMN).

The contract has been finalised and it has been decided that all six ships will be built by local shipbuilder Boustead Heavy Industries Corporation (BHIC) for the RMN at a ceiling price of RM9 billion (US$2.8 billion), starting from 2015.

Development 

In early 2011, Malaysia announced its SGPV program with a budget of RM6 billion (US$1.9 billion) and six foreign shipbuilders announced interest in the project, most notably ThyssenKrupp Marine Systems with the MEKO 200 and Damen Schelde Naval Shipbuilding with the Sigma class 10514 as well as Naval Group's  which was ultimately selected.

In late 2011, it was announced that the Gowind class had been chosen and that the SGPV program had been awarded to Boustead Heavy Industries Corporation (BHIC)/Naval Group, with the ceiling price increasing to RM9 billion (US$2.8 billion) from RM6 billion (US$1.9 billion). The RM9 billion (US$2.8 billion) contract included intellectual property rights and technology transfer. All six ships will be built in Lumut, Malaysia and electronic components will be assembled in Cyberjaya, a township in Malaysia just south of Kuala Lumpur.

At DSA 2014, BHIC confirmed that the program is progressing rather well, with some parts already in critical design review the first ship expected to be finished by 2019. BHIC was in charge of designing the Malaysian specification.

On 5 October 2014, RMN chief Admiral Aziz told IHS Jane's that construction of the first of the six ships had started at the BHIC facilities in Lumut, and reiterating a 2019 delivery date for the first ship and the remaining five ships delivered at six-month intervals thereafter. It also stated that RMN's current planning schedule called for sea trials of the first ship to be carried out in 2018 and operational entry in 2019.

Delays
In 2020, the Malaysian government announced that the LCS project had encountered some delays. The Ministry of Defence awarded the project to BHIC in 2011 and at least two vessels slated by 2020 had not been delivered. The Ministry of Defence considered two options to resolve the delayed RM9 billion LCS project by BHIC. The first option required BHIC to complete the first of two ships, while the second option was for the government to ask Naval Group (the original designer) to complete the ships; the latter option was rejected by parliament.

Following the delays, the parliamentary Public Accounts Committee (PAC) said it would call up former defence minister Ahmad Zahid Hamidi. PAC chairman Wong Kah Woh said former RMN chief, Admiral Abdul Aziz Hj Jaafar and the main contractor of the LCS project, BHIC would also be called. Pangkor assemblyman Zambry Abdul Kadir said about 200 vendors and contractors would shut down and 10,000 workers would be affected if the LCS program continued to be delayed. On 5 May 2021, the Malaysian government decided that it would retain BHIC as the class' shipbuilder. In November 2021, Minister of Defence, Datuk Seri Hishamuddin Hussein said, the first ship will be commissioned in 2025. 

On August 4 2022, the PAC reported that RM1.4 billion had been misappropriated and that the project had been awarded through direct negotiations without an open tender. The then-defence minister Ahmad Zahid Hamidi had reportedly accepted the navy's preferred choice for a Sigma-class design on 26 May 2011, but then decided in favour of the Gowind-class design on 11 July 2011 after a discussion with Boustead Naval Shipyard. Then-chief of navy Abdul Aziz Jaafar protested against the choice and later stated that the RMN had fought a "losing battle, right from the start", citing that the Sigma was a proven concept with other navies operating it, unlike the Gowind design.

On 16 August 2022, former managing director of BHIC Ahmad Ramli Mohd Nor was charged with three counts of criminal breach of trust in Sessions Court, where he pleaded not guilty. The accused had previously served as chief of navy prior to his BHIC appointment. The following day, Senior Defence Minister Hishammuddin Hussein said that a Royal Commission of Inquiry is expected to be established to investigate the procurement process and subsequent non-delivery of the ships.

Characteristics

General 
Specifications
Displacement – 3,100 tons
Length – 111 m (overall) / 105 m (waterline)
Breadth – 16 m (main deck) / 14.2 m (waterline)
Draught – 3.85 m
Propulsion – CODAD
Maximum speed – 28 knots
Range – 5,000 nm at 15 knots
Crew – 138
Survivability – Sea State 9
Endurance – 21 days
Aircraft carried – 1 × Super Lynx 300 / Fennec AS555 / EC725

Sensors 

It is believed that the RMN had requested for Thales Herakles radar that used on the FREMM frigates but BHIC had instead chosen the SMART-S.
These following sensors have been chosen for the ships.

 Combat System: Naval Group SETIS
 Search radar: Thales SMART-S Mk2
 Fire control radar: Rheinmetall TMEO Mk2 electro-optical tracking system & TMX/EO Mk2
 Sonar: Thales CAPTAS-2 ASW suite with hull sonar and towed array sonar

Armament 

The Bofors 57 mm gun will be mounted in a stealth cupola similar to the ones mounted on the Swedish s. This frigate also equipped with two MSI DS30M 30 mm cannon as a secondary gun. BHIC also announced that there has been 16 Sylver VLS allocated on the deck of the ship for the surface-to-air missile although the missiles not contracted yet as of 2019. At the LIMA 2015, while the actual Naval Strike Missiles were not specifically mentioned as per contract, Kongsberg has received a Letter of Award worth approximately 20 MEUR with Boustead Naval Shipyard in Malaysia, for NSM (Naval Strike Missile) ships equipment, that is, the delivery is to prepare for NSM antiship missiles onboard the upcoming RMN's LCS which will consist of the necessary fixed installations such as launchers, cables, electronics and integration to the combat management system SETIS to be provided by DCNS; the report implies the actual cruise missiles are under a separate contract. For the anti-submarine capabilities, it is confirmed that the ships will be equipped with two J+S fixed triple torpedo launcher.

Ships of the class

See also 
 List of naval ship classes in service
 List of equipment of the Royal Malaysian Navy

Notes

References

External links 
Photos of an outdated model of the SGPV, seen without the stealth main gun
Gowind class Frigate – Royal Malaysian Navy on navyrecognition.com

Frigate classes
Stealth ships
Maharaja Lela